Vladimir Donatovich Vonog (1 February 1899 – 16 March 1942) was a Soviet-Russian international footballer, bandy player and referee.

He began his playing career in 1914 at the Putilovskiy Kruzhok in Petrograd. He played for the Petrograd-Leningrad clubs Putilovskiy Kruzhok (1917–1923), Spartak Moscow-Narvskiy (1924), and Krasny Putilovets (1925–1935). He played for the Petrograd-Leningrad All-Star teams from 1922–28, and for the RSFSR national team from 1923–25. He played in 3 friendlies for the RSFSR.

Vonog was part of the successful Krasny Putilovets tour of Germany in 1927, as well as the 1923 RSFSR national team tours in Scandinavia, Finland, Germany and Estonia.

He was known for being a very fit player. His passion and work ethic made him stand out in the game.

Aside from football, he was a good Bandy player, representing the Leningrad All-Stars (1924–36) and RSFSR national bandy team (1924–30). He was a player-coach at HK Avangard Leningrad from 1938–41. Under his management, the team reached the finals of the 1939 Soviet Bandy Cup. In 1936 he made the list of the best players of the season.

He became an association football referee in the 1930s, refereeing 18 games in the Soviet Top League. He also taught in the National Government University of Physical Culture. He was an active organizer of physical culture at the Kirov Plant, and was the first in the USSR to introduce industrial gymnastics before the start of each work day.

He died during the Siege of Leningrad. Since 1952, the bandy players of the Kirov Plant have held a Cup tournament in his honor.

Honours
 Leningrad Football Fall Championship winner, 1925.
 USSR Bandy Championship winner, 1928.
 USSR Bandy Championship runner-up, 1933.
 RSFSR champion: 1924, 1926–28.

Individual
 Honoured Master of Sport of the USSR (1934).
 4th in the list of the top 44 Soviet players of the season (1928).
 List of the 22 best players of the Bandy Federation of the USSR (1936).

References

External links
 Profile on rusteam.permian.ru (Russian) 
 Profile on fifastat.ru (Russian)

1899 births
1942 deaths
Sportspeople from Saint Petersburg
Soviet footballers
Soviet bandy players
Soviet football referees
Association football midfielders
Honoured Masters of Sport of the USSR
Victims of the Siege of Leningrad